"Thanks to You" is a song by East Coast-based female vocal trio Sinnamon, released as a single in 1982. It was a hit on the dance charts, hitting number one for two weeks in mid-1982. It also reached number 44 on the Hot Soul Singles chart.

Track listing
 12" single

Chart positions

References

1982 songs
1982 singles
Post-disco songs
Songs written by Keith Diamond (songwriter)